Barbara Allison Birley  (born 15 February 1976) is an archaeologist and museum curator.

Biography
She is the curator for the Vindolanda Trust, and serves as the membership secretary of the  Roman Finds Group. Birley was elected as a fellow of the Society of Antiquaries of London on 17 June 2021.

Select publications
Birley, B. and Greene, E. 2006. The Roman Jewellery from Vindolanda (Research reports, New Series Vol IV). Vindolanda Trust. 
Birley, B. 2014. "A penannular brooch and two strap-ends from Vindolanda". Archaeologia Aeliana Series 5. Vol 43, pp. 73-76. 
Birley, B. 2016 Keeping Up Appearances on the Romano-British Frontier, Internet Archaeology 42. 
Stocks, C., Birley, B., and Collins, R. 2018. "Stories from the Frontier: Linking Past and Present at Vindolanda through Digital Gameplay", Thersites'' 8.

References

American archaeologists
American women archaeologists
Fellows of the Society of Antiquaries of London
21st-century archaeologists
Living people
American curators
American women curators
1976 births
People from Englewood, Colorado
Women classical scholars